The men's quadruple sculls competition at the 1996 Summer Olympics in Atlanta, Georgia took place at Lake Lanier.

Competition format
This rowing event is a quadruple scull event, meaning that each boat is propelled by four rowers. The "scull" portion means that each rower uses two oars, one on each side of the boat; this contrasts with sweep rowing in which each rower has one oar and rows on only one side. The competition consisted of multiple rounds. Finals were held to determine the placing of each boat; these finals were given letters with those nearer to the beginning of the alphabet meaning a better ranking. Semifinals were named based on which finals they fed, with each semifinal having two possible finals.

With 14 boats in heats, the best 9 boats qualify directly for the semi-finals. All other boats progress to the repechage round, which offers a second chance to qualify for the semi-finals. 2 unsuccessful boats from the repechage are eliminated from the competition. The best three boats in each of the two semi-finals qualify for final A, which determines places 1–6 (including the medals). Unsuccessful boats from semi-finals A/B go forward to final B, which determines places 7–12

Results

Heats
The first 3 boats in each heat advanced to the semifinals, remainder went to the repechage.

Heat 1

Heat 2

Heat 3

Repechage
First three qualify to semifinals.

Repechage 1

Semifinals
First three places advance to Final A, the remainder to Final B.

Semifinal 1

Semifinal 2

Finals

Final B

Final A

References

Rowing at the 1996 Summer Olympics
Men's events at the 1996 Summer Olympics